Kedaung Kali Angke is a subdistrict in the Cengkareng district of Indonesia. It has postal code of 11710.

See also 
 Cengkareng
 List of administrative villages of Jakarta

Administrative villages in Jakarta